The Lac qui Parle Valley School District is a public school district in Lac qui Parle County, Minnesota. It was created in 1982 when schools from Appleton, Madison, and Milan consolidated.

Schools
The Lac qui Parle Valley School District has two elementary schools, one middle school and one high school.

Elementary schools 
Madison-Marietta-Nassau Elementary School
Appleton-Milan Elementary School

Middle school
Lac qui Parle Valley Middle School
The middle school and high school are taught in the same building.

High school
Lac qui Parle Valley High School
Opened in the fall of 1991 for grades 7–12, LQPVHS is a combination of the surrounding school districts of Madison, Marietta, Nassau, Appleton, Milan and Bellingham.

Activities and athletics
Lac qui Parle Valley School District offers these activities and athletics to its students through the Minnesota State High School League.

References

External links
 

School districts in Minnesota
Education in Lac qui Parle County, Minnesota